Georg Kreisler (18 July 1922 – 22 November 2011) was an Austrian–American Viennese-language cabarettist, satirist, composer, and author. He was particularly popular in the 1950s and 1960s. From 2007 he lived in Salzburg, Austria, with his fourth wife, . He died there on 22 November 2011 "after a severe infection," according to his wife Barbara.

Life 
Kreisler went to high school in Vienna, where he studied music theory, and learned to play violin and piano. In 1938, he was forced to flee with his parents due to increasing Nazi restrictions on Jews. In 1941, he married Philine Hollaender, daughter of Friedrich Hollaender and Blandine Ebinger. In 1943, he became an American citizen. He enlisted in the Army, trained at Camp Ritchie, and was stationed in Europe. He wrote songs for soldiers in Britain and France with the help of Marcel Prawy. After the war, he went to Hollywood and worked on movies with Charlie Chaplin. He performed at nightclubs and bars to make ends meet. In 1947, he was rejected by the record companies because his songs were "un-American", especially songs with titles such as "Please Shoot Your Husband". In 1955, he returned to Europe, first to Vienna, then Munich in 1958, Berlin in 1976, Salzburg in 1988, Basel in 1992, and back to Salzburg in 2007. He died at the age of 89 in 2011.

Style 
Kreisler is considered a master of language. His songs are characterized by black humour and uncompromising criticism of society and politics. This caused him many difficulties and also contributed to appearance prohibitions in radio and television.

Despite producing several hundred original songs Kreisler may occasionally have used ideas and material from other artists in his work. His song "" shows strong similarities to Tom Lehrer's "I Hold Your Hand in Mine", first recorded by Lehrer in 1953 on the album Songs by Tom Lehrer. Lehrer's recording predates by several years any documented recording or performance of that song by Kreisler as well as Kreisler's return to performance in German-speaking countries in 1955. Kreisler's "" (first released as "") has strong similarities to Lehrer's "Poisoning Pigeons in the Park". Kreisler and Lehrer each deny copying from the other; so far no one has succeeded in establishing which song was written first. Kreisler's "" appears to be related to the Abe Burrows song "The Girl with the Three Blue Eyes" (first recording 1950). Kreisler's song "Bidla Buh" (first recorded in the 1950s) appears to be related to the Rodgers and Hart number "To Keep My Love Alive" composed in 1943.

References

External links 

 
 "Kreisler, Georg" at Hamburg University (May 4, 2015; in German)
 

1922 births
2011 deaths
Ritchie Boys
20th-century Austrian male singers
Jewish singers
Kabarettists
Austrian male composers
Austrian lyricists
Austrian comedians
Austrian satirists
Jewish composers
Jewish Austrian comedians
Jewish American writers
Jewish emigrants from Austria to the United States after the Anschluss
Musicians from Vienna
Jewish American comedians
21st-century American Jews
Jewish Austrian writers